Soufiane Bouchikhi (born 22 March 1990 in Sint-Niklaas) is a Belgian long-distance runner. He represented his country in the 5000 metres at the 2017 World Championships narrowly missing the final. At the 2019 World Championships in Doha he made the 10 000m final and finished 13th.  In addition, he won the silver medal in the U23 category at the 2012 European Cross Country Championships.

International competitions

Personal bests

Outdoor
1500 metres – 3:43.03 (Oordegem 2021)
3000 metres – 7:55.55 (Birmingham 2017)
5000 metres – 13:19.55 (Heusden-Zolder 2018)
10,000 metres – 27:41.20 (Palo Alto 2018)
10 kilometres – 28:16(Manchester 2021)
10 miles – 48:55 (Tilburg 2016)
Half marathon – 1:02:59 (New 
York 2019)
Marathon - 2:12:39 (Dresden 2021)

Indoor
One mile – 4:02.90 (Notre Dame 2012)
3000 metres – 7:53.99 (Seattle 2012)
5000 metres – 13:46.66 (Seattle 2012)

References

1990 births
Living people
Belgian male long-distance runners
World Athletics Championships athletes for Belgium
Sportspeople from Sint-Niklaas
Belgian sportspeople of Moroccan descent
Belgian expatriates in the United States
Competitors at the 2015 Summer Universiade